Reginald was a medieval Archbishop of Canterbury-elect.

Reginald was the sub-prior of the cathedral chapter of Canterbury when the monks chose him to succeed Hubert Walter before October 1205. The election was quashed by the pope before 20 December 1206.

Citations

References

  Retrieved on 1 January 2009

Further reading

 

Archbishops of Canterbury
13th-century English Roman Catholic archbishops